Vladimir Mikhailovich Gittis (Russian: Влади́мир Миха́йлович Ги́ттис; 24 June 1881 – 22 August 1938) was a Soviet military commander and komkor. He fought in the Imperial Russian Army during World War I before going over to the Bolsheviks during the subsequent Civil War. He was a recipient of the Order of the Red Banner (1919). He commanded the forces in Leningrad following the end of the civil war. During the Great Purge, he was arrested on 28 November 1937. His name appeared on the death list of 20 August 1938 which was signed by Joseph Stalin and Vyacheslav Molotov. He was convicted that day by the Military Collegium of the Supreme Court of the Soviet Union of espionage and sentenced to death. He was executed two days later at Kommunarka.

Awards
Order of St. George, 4th degree (1915)
Order of Saint Vladimir, 4th class (1915)
Order of Saint Anna, 2nd class (1915)
Order of Saint Stanislaus (House of Romanov), 2nd class (1915)

Bibliography
 Ленин В. И. Телеграмма В. М. Гиттису. 23.XI.1918 г. — Полн. собр. соч. Изд. 5-е. Т. 50, с. 210—211.

Sources
 
 Гиттис Владимир Михайлович

1881 births
1938 deaths
Military personnel from Saint Petersburg
People from Sankt-Peterburgsky Uyezd
Communist Party of the Soviet Union members
Soviet komkors
Russian military personnel of World War I
Soviet military personnel of the Russian Civil War
Recipients of the Order of St. Vladimir, 4th class
Recipients of the Order of St. Anna, 2nd class
Recipients of the Order of Saint Stanislaus (Russian), 2nd class
Recipients of the Order of the Red Banner
Great Purge victims from Russia
People executed by the Soviet Union
Residents of the Benois House